Bolesław Szabelski (3 December 1896 in Radoryż – 27 August 1979 in Katowice) was a Polish composer of modern classical music. While his style shifted and varied over the course of his life, he is best known for his atonal work composed during the 1950s and 1960s.

Szabelski studied at Polish Musical Society School with Łysakowski in 1915. He attended the Warsaw Conservatory under Karol Szymanowski. Between 1929 and 1939, he taught organ and composition at the conservatoire of Katowice.

Szabelski began working in the neoclassical and romanticism modes typical of the early 20th century. He adopted the serialist technique in the 1950s and was one of a number of Polish new wave of composers to embrace atonality. His early work had been characterised by monumental forms and fanfare motifs and Szabelski adapted to the new aesthetic while retaining his old signatures. As a result, he developed a style described as "strikingly innovative".

He composed five symphonies (1926, 1934, 1951, 1956 and 1968), as well as concertos, chamber and choral works. Szabelski was highly influential on the "New Polish School" composers of the early 1950s, and had a formative influence on his student Henryk Mikołaj Górecki.

Works

Honours and awards
 1959 - Commander's Cross of the Order of Polonia Restituta
 1961, 1967 - Award of the Association of Polish Composers
 1972 - 1000 Anniversary Medal of the Polish State
 1976 - Commander's Cross with Star of the Order of Polonia Restituta
 Order of the Banner of Work Class I
and many state awards and prizes

References

Sources
 Rappoport-Gelfand, Lidia. Musical life in Poland: the postwar years, 1945-1977. &B Arts International, 1991.

External links

Brief overview

1896 births
1979 deaths
20th-century classical composers
Commanders with Star of the Order of Polonia Restituta
Polish classical composers
Polish male classical composers
Recipients of the Order of the Banner of Work
20th-century male musicians
Recipients of the State Award Badge (Poland)